A President's Scholar is a recipient of the academic scholarship awarded by the Government of Singapore annually, to pursue undergraduate education at a university, usually abroad. The scholarship is considered to be the most prestigious public undergraduate scholarship in Singapore awarded to students of Singaporean nationality. 

All recipients have legal obligation to serve a bond—in the form of a public service career for a certain period of time, usually ranging from 4 to 6 years, after completing his or her studies in the university.

Shortlisted candidates are interviewed by a selection committee chaired by the Chairman of the Public Service Commission (PSC) of Singapore.

The President's Scholarship by itself does not award any money or lead to any particular career in public service. As such, it is generally paired with another scholarship, which could be either of the following:
 The SAF Scholarship 
 The SPF Scholarship
 The PSC Scholarship

History
The President's Scholarship has its roots in the Queen's Scholarship, which was founded in 1885. The Queen's Scholarship was initiated by Cecil Clementi Smith, Governor of the Straits Settlements. It was awarded to the best performing student of the year by a special selection board.

The Queen's Scholarship was abolished in 1959 and replaced by the Singapore State Scholarship when Singapore gained self-governance.

In August 1964, the Yang di-Pertuan Negara Scholarship was inaugurated to replace the State Scholarship.

In 1966, after Singapore achieved independence, the Yang di-Pertuan Negara Scholarship was renamed the President's Scholarship.

Recipients
Many recipients of the President's Scholarship went on to serve in top positions in the civil service.

According to statistics collected by the newspaper The Straits Times, the schools in Singapore having the highest number of President's Scholars among their alumni are as follows:

References

External links
 Scholarship Centre of Singapore's Public Service Commission

Education in Singapore
 
Scholarships